Anchomenus is a genus of ground beetle native to the Palearctic (including Europe), the Near East and North Africa.

It contains the following species:
 Anchomenus aeneolus (Leconte, 1854)
 Anchomenus capensis Liebherr, 1991
 Anchomenus cyaneus Dejean, 1828
 Anchomenus dohrnii Fairmaire, 1866
 Anchomenus dorsalis (Pontoppidan, 1763)
 Anchomenus funebris (Leconte, 1854)
 Anchomenus kurnakovi (Kryzhanovskij, 1983)
 Anchomenus leucopus Bates, 1873
 Anchomenus quadratus (Leconte, 1854)
 Anchomenus suensoni (Mandl, 1981)
 Anchomenus tigridis Andrewes, 1927
 Anchomenus turkestanicus Ballion, 1871
 Anchomenus virescens (Motschulsky, 1865)
 Anchomenus yukihikoi (Habu, 1962)

References

External links
Anchomenus at Fauna Europaea

Platyninae
Taxa named by Franco Andrea Bonelli